The 2018 Tilia Slovenia Open was a professional tennis tournament played on hard courts. It was the sixth edition of the tournament which was part of the 2018 ATP Challenger Tour. It took place in Portorož, Slovenia between 6 – 11 August 2018.

Singles main-draw entrants

Seeds

 1 Rankings are as of 30 July 2018.

Other entrants
The following players received wildcards into the singles main draw:
  Aljaž Jakob Kaplja
  Tom Kočevar-Dešman
  Aljaž Radinski
  Nik Razboršek

The following player received entry into the singles main draw as a special exempt:
  Pavel Kotov

The following players received entry from the qualifying draw:
  Altuğ Çelikbilek
  Markus Eriksson
  Aslan Karatsev
  Frederik Nielsen

The following player received entry as a lucky loser:
  Christopher Heyman

Champions

Singles

  Constant Lestienne def.  Andrea Arnaboldi 6–2, 6–1.

Doubles

  Gerard Granollers /  Lukáš Rosol def.  Nikola Ćaćić /  Lucas Miedler 7–5, 6–3.

External links
Official Website

2018 ATP Challenger Tour
2018
2018 in Slovenian tennis